Ivan "Ivo" Pavićević (Serbian Cyrillic: Иван „Иво“ Павићевић, Danilovgrad, Principality of Montenegro, 1869 - Belgrade, Kingdom of Yugoslavia 1926) was a Montenegrin and Serbian lawyer and politician, deputy in the National Assembly of Serbia and minister in government of Kingdom of Serbia.

After finishing primary school in Danilovgrad, he went to Kingdom of Serbia, and enrolled in gymnasium in Valjevo, graduated in Belgrade, where he later graduated from Faculty of Law, after which he worked as a lawyer in Negotin. He was elected MP for the Negotin and Valjevo districts for several terms. In the governments of Ljubomir Stojanović, he was the Minister of Economy (May - July 1905) and the Minister of the Interior (July 1905 - March 1906). He was a fierce propagandist of the unification of Serbia and Montenegro. In 1921 he became the Royal Commissioner of Montenegro, in the rank of Minister. Upon his arrival as commissioner, he took over power from Marko Daković and the Executive People's Committee.

References

1869 births
1926 deaths
People from Danilovgrad
Serbs of Montenegro